James Joseph "Duffy" Waldorf, Jr. (born August 20, 1962) is an American professional golfer who plays on the PGA Tour Champions. He was previously a member of the PGA Tour, where he won four times.

Biography
Waldorf was born in Los Angeles, California. He attended UCLA where he was on the golf team from 1982 to 1985. He was a two-time NCAA All-American, 1985 College Player of the Year, and was selected for the 1985 Walker Cup.

Waldorf turned professional in 1985 and joined the PGA Tour.

Waldorf's career PGA Tour earnings are over $11.9 million. He has featured in the top 50 of the Official World Golf Rankings, peaking at 35th in 2000.

Waldorf finished T-14 in the 2007 Q-School to regain his 2008 PGA Tour card.  However, after playing in only 4 events, he underwent knee surgery in May 2008. A recurring knee problem hindered Waldorf, who sat out the entire 2009 and 2010 seasons. He played in 14 events during the 2011 season. He failed to satisfy his Medical Extension and split the 2012 season among the PGA Tour, Nationwide Tour, and Champions Tour.

Amateur wins
1984 California State Amateur, Broadmoor Invitational
1985 Pac-10 Individual Champion, Rice Planters Amateur

Professional wins (10)

PGA Tour wins (4)

PGA Tour playoff record (2–1)

Other wins (4)

Other playoff record (0–1)

PGA Tour Champions wins (2)

PGA Tour Champions playoff record (0–1)

Results in major championships

CUT = missed the half-way cut
"T" = tied

Summary

Most consecutive cuts made – 6 (1992 U.S. Open – 1993 Open Championship)
Longest streak of top-10s – 1 (three times)

Results in The Players Championship

CUT = missed the halfway cut
"T" indicates a tie for a place

Results in World Golf Championships

1Cancelled due to 9/11

QF, R16, R32, R64 = Round in which player lost in match play
"T" = Tied
NT = No tournament

Results in senior major championships
Results not in chronological order before 2022.

CUT = missed the halfway cut
"T" indicates a tie for a place
NT = No tournament due to COVID-19 pandemic

U.S. national team appearances
Amateur
Walker Cup: 1985 (winners)

See also
1986 PGA Tour Qualifying School graduates
1987 PGA Tour Qualifying School graduates
1988 PGA Tour Qualifying School graduates
1990 PGA Tour Qualifying School graduates
2007 PGA Tour Qualifying School graduates

References

External links
 

UCLA Men's Golf Media Guide

American male golfers
UCLA Bruins men's golfers
PGA Tour golfers
PGA Tour Champions golfers
Golfers from Los Angeles
People from Northridge, Los Angeles
1962 births
Living people